Václav Jiráček (born 28 September 1978 in Prague) is a Czech theatre and film actor.
He has appeared in films, TV series and theatre productions.

Life 
After doing a degree in business, he decided to go into acting and was eventually admitted to the Theatre Faculty of the Academy of Performing Arts in Prague (DAMU), from where he graduated in 2009. He is currently based in Dejvice.

Filmography 
 2016 Bohéma, directed by Jiří Weiss
 2015 Přístav
 2013 Sanitka 2
 2013 České století
 2011 Lidice
 2010 Mamas & Papas
 2010 Jseš mrtvej, tak nebreč 
 2010 [[Bludičky (film)|Bludičky]]
 2009 X=X+1 (krátkometrážní)
 2009 Janosik: A True Story
 2009 Hodinu nevíš
 2008 Guard No. 47
 2008 Dark Spirits
 2007 Na vlastní nebezpečí
 2006 Pokus
 2006 Krev zmizelého
 2006 Besame mucho
 2005 Restart
 2004 Non plus ultras
 2004 Krev zmizelého
 2003 Bespojení
 2002 Trickster

References

1978 births
Living people
Czech actors
Male actors from Prague
Academy of Performing Arts in Prague alumni
Czech male stage actors
Czech male television actors
Czech male film actors
21st-century Czech male actors